Missouri's 1st congressional district is in the eastern portion of the state. It includes all of St. Louis City and much of northern St. Louis County, including the cities of Maryland Heights, University City, Ferguson and Florissant. The district is easily the most Democratic in Missouri, with a Cook Partisan Voting Index of D+27; the next most Democratic district in the state, the Kansas City-based , has a PVI of D+11. Roughly half of the 1st district's population is African American.

Its current representative is Democrat Cori Bush, who was elected in 2020. William Lacy Clay, Jr., had previously represented the district since 2001, succeeding his father, William Lacy Clay, Sr. Bush, a progressive and leader in the Ferguson protests, beat Clay in the August 4, 2020 primary. Bush had lost the same primary in 2018 by 20 points to Clay.

Statewide election results

Presidential

List of members representing the district

Recent election results

2012

2014

2016

2018

2020

2022

Historical district boundaries

See also

Missouri's congressional districts
List of United States congressional districts

References

External links
 Congressional Biographical Directory of the United States 1774–present
 US Census Bureau
 My Congressional District

01
Constituencies established in 1847
1847 establishments in Missouri
Constituencies disestablished in 1933
1933 disestablishments in Missouri
Constituencies established in 1935
1935 establishments in Missouri